Rin Katsumata (born 3 July 1997) is a Guamanian football player who plays as a forward.

International statistics

References

1997 births
Living people
Guam international footballers
Guamanian footballers
Association football forwards